Serrated tortoise may refer to:

Kinixys erosa is a species of turtle in the family Testudinidae
Psammobates oculifer

Animal common name disambiguation pages